The men's shot put event  at the 1993 IAAF World Indoor Championships was held on 12 March.

Medalists

Results

Qualification

Final

References

Shot
Shot put at the World Athletics Indoor Championships